The Human Defense Corps are a comic book military organization published by DC Comics. They first appeared in Human Defense Corps #1 (July 2003), and were created by writer Ty Templeton and artist Clément Sauvé.

Publication history 
Human Defense Corps was a six-issue limited series published by DC Comics in 2003, written by Ty Templeton and drawn by Clément Sauvé.

The series did not sell well, and the concept was allowed to disappear until Superman and Justice League of America writer James Robinson began to feature the Corps in Superman vol. 3, starting with a passing mention of the events in the limited series in The Coming of Atlas (Superman #677, August 2008) and followed by the gradual introduction of Project 7734 from Superman: New Krypton Special (December 2008), Superman's Pal Jimmy Olsen Special #1 (December 2008), and Action Comics #871 (January 2009) by Geoff Johns, building through the more recent issues of Superman and Action Comics and the associated Superman titles Supergirl and Jimmy Olsen Special #2 (October 2009).

DC Comics later extended the Corps presence in the DC Universe in a 10-page Human Defense Corps feature in Adventure Comics (vol. 2) #8 (March 2010), directly linking it with the other stories featured in the title as part of the lead up to DC Comics' major War of the Supermen event for summer 2010.

Fictional group history
In the DC Comics universe, the Human Defense Corps is a branch of the military established by then President of the United States Lex Luthor to reduce government dependency on superhumans when a major alien crisis breaks out, act as back-up to Earth's superheroes, and specifically counter any alien threat to Earth. Membership of the Corps is open to 'Decorated veterans of alien campaigns only'.

The Corps has bases all over Earth, including below the sea (Human Defense Base Area 53) and in space (Fort Olympus Orbital Defense Station). The sea-base included scientific facilities run by Doctor Zaius, a sentient gorilla from Gorilla City, which experiments on captured extraterrestrials and demons, although its location has recently been moved off-Earth.

Their first mission comes when the 1st Special Armoured Division are sent on a reconnaissance trip to the former Soviet satellite Bulgravia to support Government troops who had encountered shape-shifting aliens with high firepower weaponry and assumed to be Durlans. They are attacked in the Forest of Galantz by vampiric aliens invisible to special tech weapons but not ordinary eyesight, and all but Sgt. Montgomery Kelly of the forward platoons, sixty-six men, are killed in the skirmish, some by blanket bombing of the area with 'holy napalm', a cross between holy water and fire-retardant gel which destroys the vampires. Sgt. Kelly and Colonel Reno Rosetti, who designed the weapon and ordered the attack on the drop site, are decorated as a result.

Some time afterwards the Corps are involved in a 'centaur attack in Turkey', of which nothing is known, and are also pursuing a drawn-out war against a mole-like race of underground people called the A'Corti, specifically in London, England.

Two years later, after dreams of the Galatz Forest incident affect a number of soldiers who were not there, a seance held by HDC Head Chaplain Charlie Graham ascertains that the members of the Corps who were assumed killed in the incident are in Hell but not actually dead and the "vampires" they fought were actually demons. Interrogating Calcabrina, a captive demon from the incident, they discover a Bulgravian mage had made a deal for his village to be spared the ravages of civil war in exchange for 66 souls and the Human Defense Corps team had stumbled in and taken their place. The demon clan took them alive to feed on their energy - which is more powerful than the energy of the dead - as part of a plan to extend their power in Hell. Guided by Calcabrina, the Third Special Armoured Division invade Hell (code-named Trans-Dimensional Interactive Zone 4 - T-Zone 4) to recover the 66 Corps members. Sgt. Kelly is supposed killed by the demon he killed two years before in Galatz Forest - but discovers he has demon blood in him as a result of the incident and cannot die and is now blood related to the demon clan. He claims the staff of the demon clan's leader Lord Scarmiglione in battle, takes his place and the Corps rescue the 66 men. The five men who are killed in the sortie now also have demon links and unspecified powers and Sgt. Kelly and the five form a diplomatic link between Hell and Earth.

Project 7734
Seven years later General Sam Lane, Lois Lane's father - who is assumed dead but, obsessed by alien invasion and 'the Kryptonian threat', has been working covertly on a programme for the U.S Government called Project 7734 - has taken external command of Squad K of the Human Defense Corps under Colonel Hazard as part of the Project and moved the main base of Project 7734 to the home planet of another dimension. The Corps now has a new motto and insignia Ad Infernos et Retrorsum (loosely meaning 'To Hell and Back') and suit technology and weaponry designed specifically to deal with Kryptonians. Squad K has nominally been created to neutralise and disarm specific Kryptonian threats, but this has been allocated to Major Krull, the villain Reactron, who is actually working directly for General Lane on Lane's own agenda - the destruction of all Kryptonians, including Superman. Reactron kills Colonel Hazard for opposing him in this.

The whereabouts of most of the original Corps team is currently unknown, although Sgt. Kelly is currently learning spell-casting with his team within Project 7734.

Membership 
Most of the current membership of Human Defense Corps is unknown as of January 2010, with the exception of Sgt. Kelly. The following have been mentioned as members of the Corps at some time:

 Colonel Skynner (Human Defense Corps #1).
 Colonel Hazard (Perseus Hazard) of K Squad - killed by Reactron for opposing his lethal actions (Action Comics #882). He was the grandson of World War II hero Ulysses "Gravedigger" Hazard.
 Colonel Reno Rosetti (Lt. Rosetti in Human Defense Corps #1) - ordered the kill on the drop site in Galatz Forest, awarded DSM (Human Defense Corps #6).
 Sergeant Montgomery Kelly (Specialist First Class) ex-Marine - only survivor of the team from the first mission. Left in charge of Corps in Hell after gaining demonic powers, now on Earth in Section K studying spell-casting with his team.
 Sergeant Chad Kiyahani - grandson of Louis "Little Sure Shot" Kiyahani from Sgt. Rock's Easy Company. Rescued from Hell.
 Sergeant Dobbs - killed in Hell and became part of 'Kelly's 5'.
 Jake Grimaldi - part of the rescue team in Hell. Now in the Science Police (Superman #677).
 Sergeant Pruett - details unknown.
 Corporal Taylor - killed in Hell and became part of 'Kelly's 5'.
 Specialist Colin Mitchell - Air Force Special Corps, rescued from Hell.
 Private David Page - rescued from Hell.
 Private Eric Stewart - ex-Coast Guard, rescued from Hell.
 Private Reynolds - rescued from Hell.
 Bradley - rescued from Hell.
 David Page - presumed killed, as contacted by seance. Rescued from Hell.
 Head Chaplain, Charlie Graham
 Doctor Zaius - seconded from Gorilla City, working on understanding alien physiology. Now lead scientist in General Lane's Project 7734.

In other media
Reno Rosetti appears in Superman & Lois, portrayed by Hesham Hammoud. He is a military lieutenant who works under Sam Lane. Rosetti later gets empowered by Morgan Edge through X-Kryptonite offscreen, kills Jason Trask before he can torture John Henry Irons, and fights Superman in Project 7734's room before being killed by a Kryptonite spear wielded by John Henry Irons.
 The Bizarro version of Reno Rosetti appears in the episode "Bizarros in a Bizarro World". He was a member of the DOD before he sided with Bizarro Ally Allston.

Notes

References

External links
Human Defense Corps #1, 4 and  6 at the DCU Guide

Fictional military organizations